W.W. "Biff" Naylor is a retired restaurant owner in Los Angeles, California. He was born in Oakland, California in 1939 and graduated from Pennsylvania State University. His father W.W. “Tiny” Naylor started Tiny's Waffle Shops in Central California in the 1920s, and operated a chain of more than 40 Tiny Naylor's and Biff's restaurants in Southern California. Biff Naylor took over operations of Tiny Naylor's after his father's death in 1959 and was still operating at least one location in 1999. The Biff's restaurant chain of the 1940s was a "forerunner to all the modern coffee shops," Naylor told the San Jose Mercury News in 2016. Those restaurants employed modern architecture in the googie style, and innovations that would be adopted widely through the restaurant industry including open exhibition cooking kitchen, stainless steel counters, refrigerated pie cases, and plate "lowerators" that warmed or cooled plates as needed. In 2017 Los Angeles magazine food critic Patric Kuh called the longtime restaurant operator "Diner royalty". Saveur magazine wrote that Biff Naylor created "The best damn coffee shops ever" in their "Saveur 100" list

Naylor is the oldest of five brothers  who ran American Restaurant Services, Inc. which operated Café River City in Sacramento, California, Tiny's family restaurant in Capitola, California, and seven Cindy's coffee shops in Northern California. He became chief executive of the Hershel's Delicatessen chain, created by Denny's founder Harold Butler, in 1987.

Naylor joined the board of the California Restaurant Association in 1983 and is former chairman of the National Restaurant Association. Naylor hired Godfather's Pizza president Herman Cain as president of the National Restaurant Association in 1996

In 2004 Naylor came out of retirement to purchase the Du-par's restaurant chain. He brought in his chef daughter Jennifer Naylor, who had formerly worked with chef Wolfgang Puck, to revamp the menu. He sold the company in 2018.

Bibliography

  
 
 
  (previously published in 1986 as Googie: Fifties Coffee Shop Architecture )

References

American restaurateurs
American chief executives of food industry companies
Businesspeople from Los Angeles
20th-century American businesspeople
Living people
Year of birth missing (living people)
Pennsylvania State University alumni